Delyasar or Delyaser, also rendered as Delyasir, may refer to:
 Delyasar-e Olya
 Delyasar-e Sofla